In mathematics, a quadric or quadric surface (quadric hypersurface in higher dimensions), is a generalization of conic sections (ellipses, parabolas, and hyperbolas). It is a hypersurface (of dimension D) in a -dimensional space, and it is defined as  the zero set of an irreducible polynomial of degree two in D + 1 variables; for example,  in the case of conic sections. When the defining polynomial is not absolutely irreducible, the zero set is generally not considered a quadric, although it is often called a degenerate quadric or a reducible quadric.

In coordinates , the general quadric is thus defined by the algebraic equation

which may be compactly written in vector and matrix notation as:

where  is a row vector, xT is the transpose of x (a column vector), Q is a  matrix and P is a -dimensional row vector and R a scalar constant.  The values Q, P and R are often taken to be over real numbers or complex numbers, but a quadric may be defined over any field.

A quadric is an affine algebraic variety, or, if it is reducible, an affine algebraic set. Quadrics may also be defined in projective spaces; see , below.

Euclidean plane 

As the dimension of a Euclidean plane is two, quadrics in a Euclidean plane have dimension one and are thus plane curves. They are called conic sections, or conics.

Euclidean space 
In three-dimensional Euclidean space, quadrics have dimension two, and are known as quadric surfaces. Their quadratic equations have the form

The quadric surfaces are classified and named by their shape, which corresponds to the orbits under affine transformations. That is, if an affine transformation maps a quadric onto another one, they belong to the same class, and share the same name and many properties.

The principal axis theorem shows that for any (possibly reducible) quadric, a suitable change of Cartesian coordinates or, equivalently, a Euclidean transformation allows putting the equation of the quadric into a unique simple form on which the class of the quadric is immediately visible. This form is called the normal form of the equation, since two quadrics have the same normal form if and only if there is a Euclidean transformation that maps one quadric to the other. The normal forms are as follows:

Each of these 17 normal forms corresponds to a single orbit under affine transformations. In one case, the imaginary cone, there is a single point. If  one has a line (in fact two complex conjugate intersecting planes). For  one has two intersecting planes (reducible quadric). For  one has a double plane. For  one has two parallel planes (reducible quadric).

Thus, among the 17 normal forms, there are nine true quadrics: a cone, three cylinders (often called degenerate quadrics) and five non-degenerate quadrics (ellipsoid, paraboloids and hyperboloids), which are detailed in the following tables. The eight remaining quadrics are the imaginary ellipsoid (no real point), the imaginary cylinder (no real point), the imaginary cone (a single real point), and the reducible quadrics, which are decomposed in two planes; there are five such decomposed quadrics, depending whether the planes are distinct or not, parallel or not, real or complex conjugate.

When two or more of the parameters of the canonical equation are equal, one obtains a quadric of revolution, which remains invariant when rotated around an axis (or infinitely many axes, in the case of the sphere).

Definition and basic properties
An affine quadric is the set of zeros of a polynomial of degree two. When not specified otherwise, the polynomial is supposed to have real coefficients, and the zeros are points in a Euclidean space. However, most properties remain true when the coefficients belong to any field and the points belong in an affine space. As usually in algebraic geometry, it is often useful to consider points over an algebraically closed field containing the polynomial coefficients, generally the complex numbers, when the coefficients are real.

Many properties becomes easier to state (and to prove) by extending the quadric to the projective space by projective completion, consisting of adding points at infinity. Technically, if

is a polynomial of degree two that defines an affine quadric, then its projective completion is defined by homogenizing  into

So, a projective quadric is the set of zeros in a projective space of a homogeneous polynomial of degree two.

As the above process of homogenization can be reverted by setting :

it is often useful to not distinguish an affine quadric from its projective completion, and to talk of the affine equation or the projective equation of a quadric.

Equation
A quadric in an affine space of dimension  is the set of zeros of a polynomial of degree 2. That is, it is the set of the points whose coordinates satisfy an equation

where the polynomial  has the form

When the characteristic of the field of the coefficients is not two, generally  is assumed; equivalently . When the characteristic of the field of the coefficients is two, generally  is assumed when ; equivalently  is upper triangular.

The equation may be shortened, as the matrix equation

with

The equation of the projective completion is almost identical:

with

These equations define a quadric as an algebraic hypersurface of dimension   and degree  two in a space of dimension .

A quadric is said to be non-degenerate if the matrix  is invertible.

A non-degenerate quadric is non-singular in the sense that its projective completion has no singular point (a cylinder is non-singular in the affine space, but it is a degenerate quadric that has a singular point at infinity).

The singular points of a degenerate quadric are the points whose projective coordinates belong to the null space of the matrix .

Normal form of projective quadrics
In real projective space, by Sylvester's law of inertia, a non-singular quadratic form P(X) may be put into the normal form

by means of a suitable projective transformation (normal forms for singular quadrics can have zeros as well as ±1 as coefficients). For two-dimensional surfaces (dimension D = 2) in three-dimensional space, there are exactly three non-degenerate cases:

The first case is the empty set.

The second case generates the ellipsoid, the elliptic paraboloid or the hyperboloid of two sheets, depending on whether the chosen plane at infinity cuts the quadric in the empty set, in a point, or in a nondegenerate conic respectively. These all have positive Gaussian curvature.

The third case generates the hyperbolic paraboloid or the hyperboloid of one sheet, depending on whether the plane at infinity cuts it in two lines, or in a nondegenerate conic respectively. These are doubly ruled surfaces of negative Gaussian curvature.

The degenerate form

generates the elliptic cylinder, the parabolic cylinder, the hyperbolic cylinder, or the cone, depending on whether the plane at infinity cuts it in a point, a line, two lines, or a nondegenerate conic respectively. These are singly ruled surfaces of zero Gaussian curvature.

We see that projective transformations don't mix Gaussian curvatures of different sign. This is true for general surfaces.

In complex projective space all of the nondegenerate quadrics become indistinguishable from each other.

Rational parametrization
Given a non-singular point  of a quadric, a line passing through  is either tangent to the quadric, or intersects the quadric in exactly one other point (as usual, a line contained in the quadric is considered as a tangent, since it is contained in the tangent hyperplane). Expressing the points of the quadric in terms of the direction of the corresponding line provides parametric equations of the following forms.

In the case of conic sections (quadric curves), this pametrization establishes a bijection between a projective conic section and a projective line; this bijection is an isomorphism of algebraic curves. In higher dimensions, the parametrization defines a birational map, which is a bijection between dense open subsets of the quadric and a projective space of the same dimension (the topology that is considered is the usual one in the case of a real or complex quadric, or the Zariski topology in all cases).

In the affine case, the parametrization is a rational parametrization of the form

In the projective case, the parametrization has the form 

One passes from one parametrization to the other by putting  and  

For computing the parametrization and proving that the degrees are as asserted, one may proceed as follows in the affine case. One can proceed similarly in the projective case.

Let  be the quadratic polynomial that defines the quadric, and  be the coordinate vector of the given point of the quadric (so,  Let  be the coordinate vector of the point of the quadric to be parametrized, and  be a vector defining the direction used for the parametrization (directions whose last coordinate is zero are not taken into account here; this means that some points of the affine quadric are not parametrized; one says often that they are parametrized by points at infinity in the space of parameters) . The points of the intersection of the quadric and the line of direction  passing through  are the points  such that

for some value of the scalar  This is an equation of degree two in  except for the values of  such that the line is tangent to the quadric (in this case, the degree is one if the line is not included in the quadric, or the equation becomes  otherwise). Substituting this solution into the expression of  one obtains the desired parametrization as fractions of polynomials of degree at most two.

Example: circle and spheres

Let consider the quadric of equation

For  this is the unit circle; for  this is the unit sphere; in higher dimension, this is the unit hypersphere.

The point  belongs to the quadric (the choice of this point among other similar points is only a question of convenience. So, the equation  of the preceding section becomes

Substituting this into  and simplifying the expression of the last coordinate, one gets the parametric equation

By homogenizing, one gets the projective parametrization

A straightforward verification shows that this induces a bijection between the points of the quadric such that  and the points such that  in the projective space of the parameters. On the other hand, all values of  such that  and  give the point  

These points are the points of the intersection of the quadric and its tangent plane at  In this specific case, these points have nonreal complex coordinates, but it suffices to change one sign in the equation of the quadric for getting real points that are not obtained with the resulting parametrization.

Rational points
A quadric is defined over a field  if the coefficients of its equation belong to  When  is the field  of the rational numbers, one can suppose that the coefficients are integers by clearing denominators.

A point of a quadric defined over a field  is said rational over  if its coordinates belong to  A rational point over the field  of the real numbers, is called a real point.

By clearing denominators, one can suppose and one supposes generally that the projective coordinates of a rational point (in a quadric defined over ) are integers. Also, by clearing denominators of the coefficients, one supposes generally that all the coefficients of the equation of the quadric and the polynomials occurring in the parametrization are integers.

Finding the rational points of a projective quadric amounts thus to solve a Diophantine equation.

It follows that, if a quadric has a rational point, it has many other rational points (infinitely many if  is infinite), and these points can be algorithmically generated as soon one knows one of them.

As said above, in the case of projective quadrics defined over  the parametrization takes the form

Because of the homogeneity, one can consider only parameters that are setwise coprime integers. If  is the equation of the quadric, a solution of this equation is said primitive if its components are setwise coprime integers. The primitive solutions are in one to one correspondence with the rational points of the quadric (up to a change of sign of all components of the solution). The non-primitive integer solutions are obtained by multiplying primitive solutions by arbitrary integers; so they do not deserve a specific study. However, setwise coprime parameters can produce non-primitive solutions, and one may have to divide by a greatest common divisor for getting the associated primitive solution.

This is well illustrated by Pythagorean triples.

By choosing  the above method provides the parametrization
 
for the quadric of equation  (The names of variables and parameters are being changed from the above ones to those that are common when considering Pythagorean triples). 

In summary, the primitive Pythagorean triples with  even are obtained as
 
The primitive Pythagorean triples with  odd are obtained as

Projective quadrics over fields 

The definition of a projective quadric in a real projective space (see above) can be formally adapted by defining a projective quadric in an n-dimensional projective space over a field. In order to omit dealing with coordinates, a projective quadric is usually defined by starting with a quadratic form on a vector space.

Quadratic form

 (Q2)  is a bilinear form.
is called quadratic form. The bilinear form  is symmetric.

In case of  the bilinear form has the property , i.e.  is
symplectic.

For  and 
( is a base of )  has the familiar form
  and

 .

For example:

n-dimensional projective space over a field 
Let  be a field,
  an -dimensional vector space over the field 
  the set of points ,
  the set of lines.
A 2-dimensional subspace is a plane.
In case of  a -dimensional subspace is called hyperplane.

Projective quadric 
A quadratic form   on a vector space  defines a quadric  in the associated projective space  as the set of the points  such that . That is,
 

(E1): For  one obtains a conic.
They intersect at point ;

For the considerations below it is assumed that .

Polar space 
For point  the set
 

If  for any , one obtains .

If  for at least one , the equation is a non trivial linear equation which defines a hyperplane. Hence

Intersection with a line 
For the intersection of an arbitrary line  with a quadric , the following cases may occur:

Proof:
From  one obtains

I) In case of  the equation  holds and it is
 for any . Hence either 
II) In case of   one obtains  and the equation
 has exactly one solution .
Hence: , which proves c).

Additionally the proof shows:
A line  through a point  is a tangent line if and only if .

f-radical, q-radical 

a)  is a projective subspace.  is called f-radical of quadric .
c) In case of  one has .

A quadric is called non-degenerate if .

(E1): For  (conic) the bilinear form is

In case of  the polar spaces are never . Hence .
In case of  the bilinear form is reduced to
Hence 
In this case the f-radical is the common point of all tangents, the so called knot.
In both cases  and the quadric (conic) ist non-degenerate.
In this example the quadric is degenerate.

Symmetries 
A quadric is a rather homogeneous object:

Proof:
Due to  the polar space  is a hyperplane.

The linear mapping

 

induces an involutorial central collineation  with axis  and centre  which leaves  invariant.

Remark:
a) An exterior line, a tangent line or a secant line is mapped by the involution  on an exterior, tangent and secant line, respectively.

q-subspaces and index of a quadric 

For example: points on a sphere or lines on a hyperboloid (s. below).

Any two maximal -subspaces have the same dimension .

Let be  the dimension of the maximal -subspaces of  then

Theorem: (BUEKENHOUT)
For the index  of a non-degenerate quadric  in  the following is true:
.

 In case of  quadric  is called sphere (or oval conic if ).
 In case of  quadric  is called hyperboloid (of one sheet).

Examples:
c) In  the quadratic form  generates a hyperboloid.

Generalization of quadrics: quadratic sets 
It is not reasonable to formally extend the definition of quadrics to spaces over genuine skew fields (division rings). Because one would get secants bearing more than 2 points of the quadric which is totally different from usual quadrics. The reason is the following statement.

A division ring  is commutative if and only if any equation , has at most two solutions.

There are generalizations of quadrics: quadratic sets. A quadratic set is a set of points of a projective space with the same geometric properties as a quadric: every line intersects a quadratic set in at most two points or is contained in the set.

See also 
Klein quadric
Rotation of axes
Superquadrics
Translation of axes

References

Bibliography 
 M. Audin: Geometry, Springer, Berlin, 2002,   p. 200.
 M. Berger: Problem Books in Mathematics, ISSN 0941-3502, Springer New York, pp 79–84.
 A. Beutelspacher, U. Rosenbaum: Projektive Geometrie,  Vieweg + Teubner, Braunschweig u. a. 1992, p. 159.
 P. Dembowski: Finite Geometries, Springer, 1968, p. 43.

External links 
Interactive Java 3D models of all quadric surfaces
Lecture Note Planar Circle Geometries, an Introduction to Moebius, Laguerre and Minkowski Planes, p. 117

 
Projective geometry

ru:Поверхность второго порядка